Cypraeovula castanea is a species of sea snail, a cowry, a marine gastropod mollusk in the family Cypraeidae, the cowries.

Subspecies
Cypraeovula castanea castanea (Higgins, 1868)
Cypraeovula castanea latebrosa Swarts & Liltved in Liltved, 2000
Cypraeovula castanea malani Lorenz & de Bruin, 2009

Description
The length of the shell attains 28.9 mm.

Distribution
This marine species occurs off the Agulhas Bank, South Africa

References

 Steyn, D.G. & Lussi, M. (1998) Marine Shells of South Africa. An Illustrated Collector’s Guide to Beached Shells. Ekogilde Publishers, Hartebeespoort, South Africa, ii + 264 pp. page(s): 60
 Higgins E.T. (1868). Description of six new species of shells. Proceedings of the Zoological Society of London. (1868): 178-180 , pl. 14
 Higgins E.T. (1868). Description of six new species of shells. Proceedings of the Zoological Society of London. (1868): 178-180 , pl. 14

External links
 Higgins E.T. (1868). Description of six new species of shells. Proceedings of the Zoological Society of London. (1868): 178-180 , pl. 14

Cypraeidae
Gastropods described in 1868